Lieutenant General Gurpal Singh Sangha, AVSM, SM, VSM is a former Chief of Staff Western Command of the Indian Army and assumed office on 30 December 2018. He assumed the post from Lt General Amarjeet Singh Bedi. He retired from his position on July 31, 2020.

Career 
He was commissioned into 11 Grenadiers in 1981. He has extensive operational experience and has held numerous commands including counter-insurgency operations in Punjab and Jammu and Kashmir as a company and brigade commander; 27 Mountain Division (Kalimpong); and GOC of Bengal area. He has also served at Warminster, Wiltshire, United Kingdom as an Indian Army Liaison officer.

During his career, he has been awarded the Vishisht Seva Medal for his contributions in sports for shooting, the Sena Medal (Distinguished) in 2006 for successful counter-insurgency operations  and the Ati Vishisht Seva Medal in 2019.

Honours and decorations

Personal life 
He has excelled in sports and has won various medals for shooting.

References 

Living people
Indian generals
Indian Army officers
Year of birth missing (living people)
Recipients of the Ati Vishisht Seva Medal
Recipients of the Sena Medal
Recipients of the Vishisht Seva Medal